

Portugal
 Angola – Manuel de Almeida e Vasconcelos, Governor of Angola (1790–1797)
 Macau – Jose Manuel Pinto, Governor of Macau (1793–1797)

Spanish Empire
Viceroyalty of New Granada – José Manuel de Ezpeleta, Viceroy of New Granada (1789–1797)
Viceroyalty of New Spain –Miguel de la Grúa Talamanca, 1st Marquis of Branciforte, Viceroy of New Spain (1794–1798)
Captaincy General of Cuba –
 Luis de las Casas y Aragorri, Governor of Cuba (1790–1796)
Juan Procopio Bassecourt y Bryas, Governor of Cuba (1796–1799)
Spanish East Indies – Rafael María de Aguilar y Ponce de León, Governor-General of the Philippines (1793–1806)
Commandancy General of the Provincias Internas – Pedro da Nava, Commandant General of the Interior Provinces (1793–1802)
Viceroyalty of Peru –
 Francisco Gil de Taboada, Viceroy of Perú (1790–1796)
 Ambrosio O'Higgins, Viceroy of Perú (1796–1801)
Captaincy General of Chile –
 Ambrosio O'Higgins, Captain General of Chile (1788–1796)
 José de Rezabal y Ugarte, Captain General of Chile (1796)
 Gabriel de Avilés, Captain General of Chile (1796–1799)
Viceroyalty of the Río de la Plata – Pedro de Melo, Viceroy of the Río de la Plata (1795–1797)

Kingdom of Great Britain
 Jamaica – Alexander Lindsay, 6th Earl of Balcarres, Governor of Jamaica (1795–1801)
 New South Wales – John Hunter, Governor of New South Wales (1795–1800)

Colonial governors
Colonial governors
1796